Beamhurst is a village in Staffordshire, England. For population details taken at the 2011 census see Croxden.

Villages in Staffordshire